Filipi de Souza Barros (born 27 July 1987), known as Filipi Souza or simply Filipi, is a Brazilian footballer who plays as a right back for Coimbra.

Club career
Born in Campinas, São Paulo, Filipi graduated from Santos' youth setup. He made his first team debut on 16 January 2008, starting in a 0–2 away loss against Portuguesa for the Campeonato Paulista championship.

Filipi made his Série A debut on 11 May, starting in a 1–3 away loss against Flamengo. It was his maiden appearance of the campaign, being a third-choice behind Apodi and Fabiano.

Filipi subsequently spent the rest of his Santos career out on loan, representing Oeste, Uberaba, and Grêmio Osasco and SEV Hortolândia before being released in December 2010.

On 19 December 2011, after a year playing for Sport Barueri, Filipi joined Marcílio Dias. After appearing rarely he moved to Resende in January 2013.

Filipi was offered to Vasco da Gama in April, but moved to Greek Football League side Glyfada on 2 September 2013. He appeared sparingly with the side, and subsequently returned to his homeland on 20 January 2014, after agreeing to a short-term deal with Cabofriense.

On 5 January 2015 Filipi signed for Portuguesa, freshly relegated to Série C.

References

External links

1987 births
Living people
Sportspeople from Campinas
Brazilian footballers
Association football defenders
Campeonato Brasileiro Série A players
Campeonato Brasileiro Série C players
Campeonato Brasileiro Série D players
Santos FC players
Oeste Futebol Clube players
Uberaba Sport Club players
Sport Club Barueri players
Clube Náutico Marcílio Dias players
Resende Futebol Clube players
Associação Desportiva Cabofriense players
Associação Portuguesa de Desportos players
São Carlos Futebol Clube players
ABC Futebol Clube players
Toledo Esporte Clube players
Associação Atlética Caldense players
Coimbra Esporte Clube players
Football League (Greece) players
A.O. Glyfada players
Brazilian expatriate footballers
Brazilian expatriate sportspeople in Greece
Expatriate footballers in Greece